Athletics was contested at the 2015 Summer Universiade from July 8 to 12 at the Gwangju Universiade Main Stadium in Gwangju, South Korea.

Medal summary

Men's events

Women's events

Medal table

Participating nations

References

Mulkeen, Jon (2015-07-09). Van der Plaetsen retains World University Games decathlon title. IAAF. Retrieved on 2015-07-10.
Mulkeen, Jon (2015-07-09). Simbine and Fajdek win World University Games titles in Gwangju. IAAF. Retrieved on 2015-07-10.

External links
Official results 

 
Universiade
Athletics
2015
2015 Universiade